In August 2014, enterovirus D68 caused clusters of respiratory disease in the United States. Cases of EV-D68 have occurred in the U.S. for decades, having first been detected in California in 1962. According to the Division of Viral Diseases at the National Center for Immunization and Respiratory Diseases EV-D68 "is one of the most rarely reported serotypes, with only 26 reports throughout the 36-year study period (1970 through 2006)."

History 
The outbreak began in 11, mostly Midwestern, states and was first confirmed in Kansas City, Missouri, and Chicago. By mid-September there were 145 suspected cases, including Colorado, Louisiana, Alabama, New York, New Jersey, North Carolina, Michigan, Missouri, Iowa, Illinois, Montana, Kentucky, Kansas, Oklahoma, Indiana, Connecticut, Massachusetts, Rhode Island, and Wisconsin (Including one involving a previously asthmatic non-immunocompromised adult). In Canada in September 2014, 49 cases of the virus were confirmed in Alberta, three in British Columbia, and over 100 in Ontario. Health officials reported Los Angeles County's first case of viral infection on October 1, 2014. By October 2, 6 more cases had been reported in California: four in San Diego County, and one each in Ventura and Alameda counties.

The CDC later reported that from mid-August to Oct. 10,  691 people in 46 states and the District of Columbia had come down with a respiratory illness caused by EV-D68. Five children died.

Epidemiology
The outbreak is the largest ever reported in North America. Enterovirus infections are not rare; there are millions of isolated infections every year. One possibility is that CDC began looking for the virus only after the outbreak. CDC received specimens for lab testing after the outbreak-related hospitalizations.

The surveillance shows that a number of cases are admitted to the hospital each year. The Midwest has been hit in this outbreak. 
Previously in the United States, EV-D68 was uncommon. This outbreak represents a growth in the incidence.

Prevention
No vaccine for D68 exists currently. Prevention of the outbreak affecting oneself is possible by regular handwashing and other forms of infection control.

References

External links
 
 

Enterovirus-associated diseases
2014 disease outbreaks
2014 disasters in Canada
2014 disasters in the United States
August 2014 events in the United States
Disease outbreaks in the United States
Disease outbreaks in Canada